South Carter Mountain is a mountain located in Coos County, New Hampshire. The mountain is part of the Carter-Moriah Range of the White Mountains, which runs along the northern east side of Pinkham Notch.  South Carter is flanked to the northeast by Middle Carter Mountain and to the southeast Mount Hight.

See also

 List of mountains in New Hampshire
 Four-thousand footers
 White Mountain National Forest

External links
 
 AMC: South Carter
  hikethewhites.com: South Carter

Mountains of New Hampshire
Mountains of Coös County, New Hampshire
New England Four-thousand footers
Mountains on the Appalachian Trail